Qeshlaq-e Nowruz (also Romanized as Qeshlāq-e Nowrūz, Qeshlāq-e Now Rūz, Qeshlāq Nowrūz, and Qishlāq Naurūz) is a village in Howmeh Rural District, in the Central District of Bijar County, Kurdistan Province, Iran. At the 2006 census, its population was 517, in 106 families. The village is populated by Kurds.

References 

Towns and villages in Bijar County
Kurdish settlements in Kurdistan Province